Miloš Đurđić (born 30 April 1994) is a Bosnian-Herzegovinian footballer, who most recently played for NK Travnik.

Club career
Đurđić started training football in Borac Banja Luka academy where he passed throw the whole youth categories. He stayed with the club until summer 2013 when he overgrown youth selection and permanently moved to local football club Naprijed. After a season he spent with the club, Đurđić joined Sloga Srbac in 2014. During the first season with Sloga Srbac, Đurđić scored 2 goals in the Regional League West, including one in an 8–1 victory against Gomionica. Making promotion in the Second League of the Republika Srpska, Đurđić continued playing with the club in the 2015–16 season. He had been penalized with a red card in a match against Laktaši. Đurđić was also a scorer of two goals in a match against Liješće. In the first half of the 2016–17 season, Đurđić made 10 appearances with 1 goal for the club. At the beginning of 2017 he signed with ČSK Čelarevo, where he made a debut in the 25 fixture of the 2016–17 Serbian First League season, replacing Bogdan Tepić in second half of the match against Zemun. In summer 2017, Đurđić left the club. Later same year, he joined Travnik. He left the club on 1 January 2018, where his contract expired.

Honours
Sloga Srbac
Regional League West (Republika Srpska): 2014–15

References

1994 births
Living people
Sportspeople from Banja Luka
Serbs of Bosnia and Herzegovina
Bosnia and Herzegovina footballers
Serbian footballers
Association football central defenders
FK ČSK Čelarevo players
NK Travnik players
Serbian First League players
First League of the Federation of Bosnia and Herzegovina players